Josiah Funck Mansion is a historic home located in Lebanon, Lebanon County, Pennsylvania. It was built about 1855, and is a three-story, brick residence with a mansard roof in the Second Empire style.  The main section measures 65 feet by 40 feet.  Two additions were built sometime after 1932. It features a two-story porch with decorative woodwork.

The home was added to the National Register of Historic Places in 1980.

References

Houses on the National Register of Historic Places in Pennsylvania
Second Empire architecture in Pennsylvania
Houses completed in 1855
Houses in Lebanon County, Pennsylvania
National Register of Historic Places in Lebanon County, Pennsylvania